The Timaru by-election of 1985 was a by-election for the electorate of Timaru during the term of the 40th New Zealand Parliament. It was triggered by the death of Sir Basil Arthur (who had held the seat since 1962) on 1 May 1985. Sir Basil was Speaker of the House, and had inherited the rank of baronet from his father in 1949.

The by-election was held on 15 June 1985 and was won by Maurice McTigue of the National Party with a majority of 1,492 votes.

Campaign
David Lange recalled a meeting during the by-election campaign when Labour general secretary Tony Timms manhandled a noisy heckler out of the building. He said that the Labour candidate Jan Walker was a good lawyer (and was later a Family Court judge), but that the Labour Party organisation (i.e. head office) insisted on the selection of a candidate who "did not live in Timaru and her opinions, and even her appearance, were at odds with the conservative character of the electorate"; although Jim Anderton predictably (and publicly) blamed the defeat on "the government’s abandonment of traditional Labour policy".

New Zealand Party founder Bob Jones (who had already achieved his primary goal of ending the Muldoon government) was disappointed by his party's performance in the by-election came to the decision to put the party into recess.

The by-election was the last time the Social Credit Party name was used before the party renamed itself as the Democratic Party later in the year.

Results
The following table gives the election results:

References

Timaru 1985
Timaru
Politics of Canterbury, New Zealand
June 1985 events in New Zealand